The 2023 Swiss Open (officially known as Yonex Swiss Open 2023 for sponsorship reasons) is a badminton tournament that will take place in St. Jakobshalle at Basel, Switzerland from 21 to 26 March, with a total prize of $210,000.

Tournament
The 2023 Swiss Open will be the eighth tournament of the 2023 BWF World Tour and is part of the Swiss Open championships which has been held since 1955. It is organized by the Swiss Badminton with sanction from the Badminton World Federation.

Venue
This tournament will be held at St. Jakobshalle in Basel, Switzerland.

Point distribution 
Below is the point distribution table for each phase of the tournament based on the BWF point system for the BWF World Tour Super 300 event.

Prize pool
The total prize money is US$210,000 with the distribution of the prize money in accordance with BWF regulations.

Men's singles

Seeds 

 Viktor Axelsen
 Lee Zii Jia 
 Chou Tien-chen 
 Kunlavut Vitidsarn
 Prannoy H. S.
 Lu Guangzu
 Zhao Junpeng
 Lakshya Sen

Wildcard 
Swiss Badminton awarded a wild card entry to Tobias Künzi of Switzerland.

Finals

Top half

Section 1

Section 2

Bottom half

Section 3

Section 4

Women's singles

Seeds 

 Wang Zhiyi
 Carolina Marín
 Ratchanok Intanon
 P. V. Sindhu
 Han Yue
 Pornpawee Chochuwong
 Busanan Ongbumrungphan
 Nozomi Okuhara

Finals

Top half

Section 1

Section 2

Bottom half

Section 3

Section 4

Men's doubles

Seeds 

 Aaron Chia / Soh Wooi Yik 
 Satwiksairaj Rankireddy /  Chirag Shetty
 Ong Yew Sin / Teo Ee Yi 
 Liang Weikeng / Wang Chang 
 Leo Rolly Carnando / Daniel Marthin 
 Muhammad Shohibul Fikri / Bagas Maulana 
 Lu Ching-yao / Yang Po-han 
 Mark Lamsfuß / Marvin Seidel

Finals

Top half

Section 1

Section 2

Bottom half

Section 3

Section 4

Women's doubles

Seeds 

 Zhang Shuxian / Zheng Yu 
 Apriyani Rahayu / Siti Fadia Silva Ramadhanti 
 Pearly Tan / Thinaah Muralitharan 
 Jongkolphan Kititharakul / Rawinda Prajongjai 
 Baek Ha-na / Lee So-hee 
 Yuki Fukushima / Sayaka Hirota 
 Benyapa Aimsaard / Nuntakarn Aimsaard 
 Gabriela Stoeva / Stefani Stoeva

Finals

Top half

Section 1

Section 2

Bottom half

Section 3

Section 4

Mixed doubles

Seeds 

 Dechapol Puavaranukroh / Sapsiree Taerattanachai 
 Thom Gicquel / Delphine Delrue 
 Tan Kian Meng / Lai Pei Jing 
 Mark Lamsfuß / Isabel Lohau 
 Feng Yanzhe / Huang Dongping (Withdrew)
 Goh Soon Huat / Shevon Jemie Lai 
 Rinov Rivaldy / Pitha Haningtyas Mentari 
 Robin Tabeling / Selena Piek

Finals

Top half

Section 1

Section 2

Bottom half

Section 3

Section 4

References

External links
 Tournament Link
 Official Website

Swiss Open (badminton)
Swiss Open
Swiss Open
Swiss Open (badminton)